Argerich is a surname of Catalan origin. It may refer to:

 Cosme Argerich (1758–1820), Surgeon General in the Argentine Revolutionary Army of the Andes
 Juan Argerich (1862–1924), Argentine statesman
 Manuel Argerich (1851–1875), Argentine politician, writer, and medical doctor
 Martha Argerich (born 1941), Argentine concert pianist

Catalan-language surnames